Gatewood House is a historic plantation house in Eatonton, Georgia that is listed on the U.S. National Register of Historic Places. It was built sometime during 1805-1812 while the property was owned by a John Keating. As of 1975, the house remained unaltered from its original construction. It is significant for its "refined yet simple" architecture, unusual and hence more important given its era.

Owners include:
pre-1812 John Keating built it, sold it for $1200 to James O'Neal
James O'Neal made the property into a successful cotton plantation, sold it for $1900 in 1820
Z. Weddington, sold it for $1400
William Walker owned it
James Jackson sold the house and its  for $1200 to Mrs. Francis M. Gatewood
Mrs. Francis M. Gatewood, whose family kept it into the 1920s
U.S. government purchased it
Mr. and Mrs. John Copeland, owners in 1975, purchased it not long before then

Reportedly the hand of Ann E. Gatewood was sought by William H. Seward (later U.S. Secretary of State).

Turnwold Plantation where Joel Chandler Harris lived and wrote, is nearby.

It was listed on the National Register of Historic Places in 1975.

References

Houses on the National Register of Historic Places in Georgia (U.S. state)
Houses completed in 1805
Houses in Putnam County, Georgia
1805 establishments in Georgia (U.S. state)
National Register of Historic Places in Putnam County, Georgia
Plantations in Georgia (U.S. state)